Tanasith Siripala (born 9 August 1995), simply known as Tao, is a Thai professional footballer who plays as a winger for Thai League 1 club Port. Tanasith is affectionately dubbed "Taodinho" by Thai supporters for his resemblance to the Brazilian star Ronaldinho.

Early life
Thanasit Siriphala was born in Khemarat District, Ubon Ratchathani, Thailand. He regularly played football as a child, and moved to Bangkok for studied and played football at Pensmith School. In this school he played  in tournament Asian schools football U-15 championship 2010 at indonesia

Club career

Bangkok Glass
Tanasith Siripala has signed for Bangkok Glass as a trainee in 2010  and played for a youth team. He began his professional career in 2012 at the age of 16, Tanasith was being loaned out by the club in same year to Rangsit to gain experience and toughen up in Khǒr Royal Cup. He made his professional football debut on 9 January 2012 in 1–1 draw against Dhurakij Pundit University F.C.

on 13 January 2012 Tanasith scored his first goal In 1–0 win over Army Welfare Department F.C. At Rangsit F.C. he played 5 games and scored 3 goals, helping the club gain promotion to Regional League Division 2 (Bangkok & Field Region) as Khǒr Royal Cup champion.

Tanasith returned to Bangkok Glass in 2012 Thai Premier League and finally made his league debut for Bangkok Glass on 7 April 2012, in a 2–0 win over Police United at Leo Stadium. He played 9 games for Bangkok Glass in the league that season and they finished eighth.

In 2013 season at the age of 17, he made his first goal for Bangkok Glass on 28 September 2013 in Thai Premier League 5–1 win over TOT

International career

In 2016 Tanasith Siripala was selected in Thailand U23 squad for 2016 AFC U-23 Championship in Qatar.

International goals

under-19

under-23

Honours

Clubs
Bangkok Glass
 Thai FA Cup (1): 2014

International
Thailand U-23
 Dubai Cup (1): 2017
 BIDC Cup (Cambodia) (1): 2013
Thailand U-21
 Nations Cup (1): 2016

References

External links
 Profile at Goal

1995 births
Living people
Tanasith Siripala
Tanasith Siripala
Association football wingers
Tanasith Siripala
Tanasith Siripala
Tanasith Siripala
Tanasith Siripala
Footballers at the 2018 Asian Games
Tanasith Siripala